Asociația Radioamatorilor din Moldova (ARM) (in English, Amateur Radio Society of Moldova) is a national non-profit organization for amateur radio enthusiasts in Moldova. Key membership benefits of ARM include the sponsorship of amateur radio operating awards and radio contests, and a QSL bureau for those members who regularly communicate with amateur radio operators in other countries. ARM represents the interests of Moldovan amateur radio operators before Moldovan, European, and international telecommunications regulatory authorities. ARM is the national member society representing Moldova in the International Amateur Radio Union.

References 

Moldova
Clubs and societies in Moldova
Radio in Moldova
Organizations based in Chișinău